Weightlifting at the 2019 Pacific Games in Apia, Samoa was held on 9–13 July 2019 at the Faleata Sports Complex in Tuanaimato. The competition included ten men's and ten women's weight classes, with separate medals awarded in each weight class for the snatch and clean and jerk, as well as for the total lift.

Together with that year's Commonwealth and Oceania Championships, they were held concurrently as a single event designated the 2019 Pacific Games, Oceania & Commonwealth Championships. Athletes from certain countries were able to contest multiple championships simultaneously (including age-group variants).

Participating nations

Medal summary

Medal table

Men's medalists

Women's medalists

See also
 Weightlifting at the Pacific Games

References

2019 Pacific Games
Pacific Games
2019